Kristen Silverberg (born 1970) was the United States Ambassador to the European Union from July 2008 until January 2009. She was nominated by President George W. Bush on April 24, 2008 and confirmed by the United States Senate on June 27, 2008. On July 22, 2008, she presented her credentials. She was succeeded by William Kennard who was nominated by President Barack Obama on August 6, 2009 and confirmed by the United States Senate on November 20, 2009.

Career
Silverberg was previously Assistant Secretary of State for International Organization Affairs for the United States government. In that role, she was in charge of the Bureau of International Organization Affairs, a part of the State Department.

Prior to her appointment to the State Department, Silverberg served in the following positions in the White House:
 Special Assistant to the President in the Office of the Chief of Staff
 Deputy Assistant to the President for Domestic Policy
 Deputy Assistant to the President and Advisor to the Chief of Staff 

Silverberg also served as Senior Adviser to Paul Bremer when he was Administrator of the Coalition Provisional Authority in Iraq—reportedly "because she was interested in the work, and not at the behest of the White House." She has been described as a "rising star" in the White House, and as "one of the White House's most trusted behind-the-scenes aides."

Prior to coming to work for the White House, Silverberg served as a law clerk, first to Appellate Court Judge David B. Sentelle, and later to Supreme Court Justice Clarence Thomas.

She currently sits on the advisory board for Washington, DC nonprofit America Abroad Media.

Personal life
Silverberg was born in 1970 in Alpine, Texas to Rhoda and Eric Silverberg. Silverberg is a graduate of Harvard University and The University of Texas School of Law (1996). She wrote an article (PDF) in 2002 encouraging fellow alumni to seek legal careers in government.

On May 24, 2008 she married Paul V. Lettow at the Lady Bird Johnson Wildflower Center in Austin, Texas; Lettow is the son of Charles F. Lettow, who since July 2003 has been a judge of the U.S. Court of Federal Claims.

See also 
 List of law clerks of the Supreme Court of the United States (Seat 10)

References

External links
Biography from the U.S. State Department website

1970 births
Living people
People from Alpine, Texas
Harvard College alumni
University of Texas School of Law alumni
Texas lawyers
Assistants to the President of the United States
Coalition Provisional Authority
United States Assistant Secretaries of State
American women ambassadors
Ambassadors of the United States to the European Union
George W. Bush administration personnel
21st-century American diplomats
Law clerks of the Supreme Court of the United States